William Owen Smith (born 4 November 1998) is an English professional footballer who plays as a defender for Scunthorpe United on loan from  club Harrogate Town. 

He made his senior debut for Barnsley in the EFL Trophy in 2018, and spent time with National League North club Darlington in 2018–19. He joined Harrogate Town in 2019, and helped them win the 2019–20 FA Trophy and gain promotion to the Football League for the first time in the club's history.

Career
Smith was born in Leeds, West Yorkshire. He took up a scholarship with Barnsley in 2015, and was named Academy Player of the Year for the 2015–16 season. He turned professional in May 2017, and signed a new one-year contract in July 2018. Smith made his senior debut for Barnsley on 13 November 2018 in the EFL Trophy.

In December, Smith and Barnsley team-mate Romal Palmer joined National League North club Darlington on a 28-day youth loan. Smith played the whole of all six of Darlington's matches during the initial loan, which was then extended to the end of the season.

He was offered a new contract by Barnsley at the end of the 2018–19 season, but chose instead to leave the club and sign for Harrogate Town of the National League. According to Harrogate manager Simon Weaver, Smith showed at Darlington that he could cope with the physicality of men's football: "He's brave. He's a proper defender. He doesn't mind putting his head in there where it hurts and he knows how to defend his six-yard box. He's a big strong boy, but at the same time, he possesses that quality that the modern breed of centre-half has to have in his locker and can play football."

Smith started 36 of a possible 37 league matches as Harrogate finished second in a 2019–20 National League season truncated by the COVID-19 pandemic. In the play-offs, his header led to Jack Muldoon's goal by which Harrogate beat Boreham Wood in the play-off semi-final, and in the final, despite "not [having] a straightforward afternoon up against the imposing physical presence of Kyle Wootton", he helped his team beat Notts County 3–1 and gain promotion into the Football League for the first time in their history. Smith was also on the winning side in that season's FA Trophy, whose final was not played until May 2021.

He remained a regular starter in League Two, was reportedly "in the form of his life", and scored his first Football League goal on 31 October, but in the next match, he fell awkwardly after an aerial challenge and was taken to hospital with his neck in a brace. He suffered mild whiplash, but was out for nearly three months with torn tendons at the top of a hamstring. He returned to his regular spot in the starting eleven and helped his team retain their Football League status, but suffered a dead leg in 2021 pre-season and lost his place to the experienced new signing Rory McArdle. He played throughout October before undergoing surgery on a double hernia and did not return to the starting eleven until mid-February 2022.

On 17 February 2023, Smith returned to the National League when he joined Scunthorpe United on an initial one-month loan deal. Having scored three goals in six matches, the loan was extended until the end of the season on 20 March.

Career statistics

Honours
Harrogate Town
 National League play-offs: 2020
 FA Trophy: 2019–20

References

1998 births
Living people
Footballers from Leeds
English footballers
Association football defenders
Barnsley F.C. players
Darlington F.C. players
Harrogate Town A.F.C. players
Scunthorpe United F.C. players
National League (English football) players
English Football League players